Rafsanjan Cultural Estate ( – Mojamvʿeh-ye Mowtowr Hāy Kesht va  Şanʿat-e Rafsanjān) is a village/cultural estate in Jazmurian Rural District, Jazmurian District, Rudbar-e Jonubi County, Kerman Province, Iran. At the 2006 census, its population was 91, in 19 families.

References 

Populated places in Rudbar-e Jonubi County